12 Train can refer to:

 12 (New York City Subway service)
 Paris Métro Line 12
 Line 12, Beijing Subway
 Line 12, Shanghai Metro

See also 

 Line 12 (disambiguation)